Magnificent Doll is a 1946 American drama film directed by Frank Borzage and starring Ginger Rogers as Dolley Madison and David Niven as Aaron Burr.  The supporting cast features Burgess Meredith as James Madison and Grandon Rhodes as Thomas Jefferson.  The screenplay was written by Irving Stone (author of Lust for Life and The Agony and the Ecstasy).

Summary
A young woman is wooed by Aaron Burr and James Madison.

Cast
 Ginger Rogers as Dolley Payne Madison
 David Niven as Aaron Burr
 Burgess Meredith as James Madison
 Peggy Wood as Mrs. Payne
 Stephen McNally as John Todd 
 Robert Barrat as Mr. Payne
 Grandon Rhodes as Thomas Jefferson
 Frances E. Williams as Amy 
 Henri Letondal as Count D'Arignon
 Joseph Forte as Senator Ainsworth 
 John Hamilton as Mr. Witherspoon (uncredited)
 Olaf Hytten as Blennerhassett (uncredited) 
 Arthur Space as Alexander Hamilton (uncredited) 
 Larry Steers as Lafayette (uncredited)
 Grace Cunard as woman with a baby (uncredited)

References

External links
 

1946 films
American drama films
1946 drama films
Films directed by Frank Borzage
Cultural depictions of Thomas Jefferson
Cultural depictions of James Madison
Films scored by Hans J. Salter
American black-and-white films
Universal Pictures films
1940s English-language films
1940s American films